Imdadullah Muhajir Makki (1817 – 1899) was an Indian Muslim Sufi scholar of the Chishti Sufi order. His disciples include Muhammad Qasim Nanautawi, Rashid Ahmad Gangohi, and Ashraf Ali Thanwi. In the Indian Rebellion of 1857, he led the Muslims in Thana Bhawan to fight against British.

Early life
Imdadullah Muhaajir Makki was born in Nanauta, British India in 1817. His father Muhammad Amīn named him Imdad Hussain. However, Shah Muhammad Ishaq gave him the name of Imdādullah.

Aged seven, Imdādullah lost his mother who wrote her will that none shall touch her kid after her, and kept Imdādullah more beloved to her in those seven years; this became a hurdle that no one took care of Imdādullah's education. He then started memorizing the Quran on his own but failed to do so. Aged 16, he traveled to Delhi with Mamluk Ali Nanautawi to seek education.

Religious work and travels
At the age of eighteen, his bay'at was accepted by Nasiruddin Naqshbandi. Later he went to study under Mianji (Noor Mohammad Jhanjhanvi), as an initiate of the Chishti-Sabiri Sufi order, but after Mianji's death he temporarily became a semi-recluse. After wandering in the wilderness for six months he was overcome by a strong urge to travel to Medina. On 7 December 1845, he arrived at Banares. From there, he departed for Ottoman Arabia for Hajj and pilgrimage of the tomb of shrine of Muhammad.

After the completion of his hajj, Imadadullah remained with Ishaq Muhajir Makki and others. Shah informed him that, after his pilgrimage to Medina, he should return to India. Sayyid Qudratullah Banarasi Makki sent several of his murids to accompany him to Medina.

Freedom struggle against the British
In Thana Bhawan, the local Sunnis declared Imdadullah their leader. In May 1857 the Battle of Shamli took place between the forces of Imdadullah and the British.

Disciples
Disciples include:
 Ahmad Hasan Amrohi
 Asghar Hussain Deobandi
 Ashraf Ali Thanwi
 Muhammad Qasim Nanautawi
 Rashid Ahmad Gangohi
 Muhammad Yaqub Nanautawi
 Mahmud Hasan Deobandi
 Imam Muhammad Anwaarullah Farooqui
 Sayyid Muhammad Abid
 Najib Ali Choudhury

Marriages
Imdadullah married for the first time at the age of 48. After the death of his first wife, he married a blind widow. Because she was blind, she could not manage all household work, so she requested him to take another wife so all household work. Imdadullah then married for the third time. None of his three wives bore him children.

Literary works
His books include:
Faisla Haft Masala
Kulliyat-e-Imdadiya
Hashiya Mathnavi Moulana Rumi: This is an annotation in Persian on the Mathnawi-i Ma’nawi by Rumi. During Imadadullah's lifetime, only two parts could be printed. The remainder was printed after his death.
Ghiza-e-Ruh (The Nourishment of the Soul): Imadadullah wrote this book in 1264 AH. Mianji Noor Mohammad Jhanjhanvi is also discussed. It consists of 1600 verses of poetry.
Ikleelul Quran (Tafseer Quran in Arabi). First Published in Bahraich by Taj Offcet Press formerly Aqeel Press NazirPura Bahraich
Jihad-e-Akbar (The Greater Jihad): He composed this book in 1268 AH. It is a poetic work in Persian that he translated it into Urdu. It consists of 17 pages with 679 verses.
Mathnavi Tuhfatul Ushshaq (Mathnavi – A Gift for Lovers): This consists of 1324 poetic verses and was compiled in 1281 AH.
Risala Dard Ghamnak (The Treatise of Painful Sorrow): It consists of 5 pages with 175 verses.
Irshad-e-Murshid (The Directive of the Murshid): This book deals with wadha'if, muraaqabaat, aurad, and shajaraat of the four . It was written in 1293 AH.
Zia ul Quloob (Glitter of the Hearts): This book is in Persian. He wrote this kitab in Makkah in 1282 AH on the request of Hafiz Muhammad Yusuf, the son of Hafiz Muhammad Zamin.

Death
Imdadullah died at Mecca in 1899. He was buried in the Jannat al-Mu'alla cemetery besides the grave of Rahmatullah Kairanwi.

See also
Muhammad Mian Mansoor Ansari

References

Bibliography
 
 
 

Hanafis
Maturidis
1817 births
1899 deaths
Chishti Order
Indian Sunni Muslims
19th-century Muslim scholars of Islam
People from British India
Burials at Jannat al-Mu'alla